The Constitution of the German Reich can refer to the following:

 The Frankfurt Constitution of 1849.
 The Constitution of the German Empire of 1871.
 The Weimar Constitution of 1919.